Perunthenaruvi Waterfalls are waterfalls  from Pathanamthitta in Pathanamthitta District, Central Travancore region, Kerala State, India. It is a popular tourist destination situated in Vechoochira Panchayat of Ranni taluk. The one shore of this waterfall is Kudamurutty and Vechoochira is the other. The main route to this waterfall starts from Ranni - Athikkayam - Kudamurutty - Perunthenaruvi. It is a fine place to spend time with family in a very serene atmosphere.Nearest Railway Station Is Thiruvalla,Located At A Distance Of 49km.

Etymology

The name Perunthenaruvi derived from the two Malayalam words Perunthen (great honey) and aruvi (stream).

Location
Located on the Western Ghats of the Sahyadri Range, Perunthenaruvi is famous for the waterfalls there. The waterfalls are known for their wide area, rather than their height. It is located in Pathanamthitta district of Kerala state. The stream later unites with the Pamba River. It is beautiful and dangerous at the same time.

Gallery

See also
Perunthenaruvi Project

Notes

Waterfalls of Kerala
Geography of Pathanamthitta district
Pamba River